C.C. Dasham and Jeb Alexander are the pseudonyms of Isham W. Perkins (January 30, 1900 – June 15, 1976) and Carter Newman Bealer (October 17, 1899 – May 11, 1965) whose lives are recounted in Jeb and Dash: A Diary of Gay Life 1918–1945. Jeb and Dash are the diaries of Carter Newman Bealer edited by his niece Ina Russell. Another book, Carter & Isham: In a Colorado Canyon: A Companion Volume to Ina Russell's Jeb and Dash was edited by Neal Cordan.

Early lives
Carter Newman Bealer aka "Jeb" was born on October 17, 1899, in Atlanta, Georgia, the son of Pierre McFarland Bealer (1867–1954) and Alba Happy Newman (1872–1904).

In 1908 Jeb moved to Washington, D.C., with his family. He attended Central High School. From 1918 to 1922 Jeb attended Washington and Lee University, Lexington, Virginia, where in 1919 he met Dash. In 1927 Jeb graduated from George Washington University, Washington, D.C.

Isham W. Perkins aka "Dash" was born on January 30, 1900, in Henderson, Tennessee, the son of George N. Perkins (1862–1933) and Elizabeth Ada Purdy (1864–1937).

Dash moved with his family to St. Petersburg, Florida, where he attended high school. He graduated from the Memphis State Teachers College in Memphis, Tennessee.

Careers
At the beginning of the 1920s, Dash moved to Detroit, Michigan, and worked for the Metropolitan Life Insurance Co. In 1925 he moved to Washington, D.C., and took a position as librarian, first at the Department of Agriculture and later at the Department of State. He also worked for the U. S. Book Exchange at the Library of Congress. In 1955 he moved to the Dumbarton Oaks Library. He retired in 1967.

Jeb worked as proofreader and Editor at the Government Printing Office, Washington, D.C. From 1912 to 1964, one year before his death, he kept diaries chronicling his life and his relationship with Dash.

Their jobs in the government bureaucracy field of Washington, D.C., make their relationship notable, due to the risks they faced to carry it on.

Personal lives

While at Washington and Lee University, Dash had another boyfriend, Harry Agneau (pseudonym of Rutherford Roland Hall), who died by suicide when he and Dash were expelled due to their relationship being unveiled. In that period, Jeb's boyfriend was Randall Hare, a married man.

Jeb and Dash took a trip to France at the outbreak of World War II.

Jeb died on May 11, 1965, in Washington, D.C., and is buried at Fort Lincoln Cemetery, Brentwood, Maryland. He left his large collection of books to the Washington and Lee Library.

Dash died on June 15, 1976, in Boca Raton, Florida, and is buried at Henderson City Cemetery, Tennessee.

References

People from Atlanta
People from Chester County, Tennessee
American gay men
LGBT people from Washington, D.C.
20th-century American LGBT people